Tewa Promma is a Thai footballer. He currently plays for Thai Division 1 League clubside Suphanburi.

See also
Football in Thailand
List of football clubs in Thailand

References

External links
Profile at Thaipremierleague.co.th

Living people
Tewa Promma
1988 births
Association football forwards
Tewa Promma
Tewa Promma
Tewa Promma
Tewa Promma